The 1970 British Open Championship was held at the Edgbaston Priory Club in Birmingham from 8–13 December 1969. Jonah Barrington won his third title defeating Geoff Hunt in the final.

Seeds

Draw and results

First round

Second round

Main draw

Third Place
 Aftab Jawaid beat  Muhammad Yasin 5-9 9-2 9-4 9-1

References

Men's British Open Squash Championships
Squash in England
Men's British Open Championship
Men's British Open Squash Championship
Men's British Open Squash Championship, 1970
Sports competitions in Birmingham, West Midlands
Men's British Open Squash Championship